
Gmina Trzebielino is a rural gmina (administrative district) in Bytów County, Pomeranian Voivodeship, in northern Poland.

Villages
Gmina Trzebielino contains the villages and settlements of Bąkowo, Bożanka, Broczyna, Cetyń, Ciemnica, Czarnkowo, Dolno, Dretyniec, Glewnik, Grądki Dolne, Gumieniec, Kleszczewo, Miszewo, Moczydło, Myślimierz, Objezierze, Owczary, Poborowo, Popielewo, Radaczewo, Starkówko, Starkowo, Suchorze, Szczyciec, Toczek, Trzebielino, Uliszkowice, Wargoszewo, Zielin and Zielin Górny.

Neighbouring gminas
Gmina Trzebielino is bordered by the gminas of Dębnica Kaszubska, Kępice, Kobylnica, Kołczygłowy and Miastko.

References
Polish official population figures 2006

Trzebielino
Bytów County